Sergey Duboyenko (born 27 June 1986) is a Belarusian footballer who plays for Viktoriya Maryina Gorka.

External links
 
 
 Profile at pressball.by

1986 births
Living people
Belarusian footballers
Association football midfielders
FC Energetik-BGU Minsk players
FC Darida Minsk Raion players
FC Naftan Novopolotsk players
FC Veras Nesvizh players
FC Slavia Mozyr players
FC Viktoryja Marjina Horka players
Belarusian football managers
FC Viktoryja Marjina Horka managers